Pierre Lequiller (born December 4, 1949) was a member of the National Assembly of France. He represented the Yvelines department,  as a member of the Union for a Popular Movement. He was the Member of Parliament for Yvelines's 4th constituency from 1988 to 2017.

References

1949 births
Living people
Union for a Popular Movement politicians
Deputies of the 12th National Assembly of the French Fifth Republic
Deputies of the 13th National Assembly of the French Fifth Republic
Deputies of the 14th National Assembly of the French Fifth Republic